Noémie Goudal (born 1984) is a French visual artist who currently resides in London. She works with photography, film and installation.

Biography
Goudal was born in Paris. She moved to London when she was 19 and studied at Central Saint Martins where she graduated in Graphic Design. She then went on to do her master's degree in art photography at the Royal College of Art; she graduated in 2010. She has exhibited internationally and had solo shows at a number of institutions such as The Photographers' Gallery, Foam Fotografiemuseum Amsterdam, Kiran Nadar Museum of Art. Her work was featured at the Azerbaijan Pavilion at the 56th Venice Biennale. In 2013, she won HSBC Prix pour la Photographie

Work
Goudal often works directly within the landscape, sometimes inserting photographic backdrops into a scene before re-photographing it. In addition to her photography, she makes video work that is thematically linked to her photos.

Goudal is represented by Galerie Les Filles du Calvaire and Edel Assanti.

References

External links
 

1984 births
Living people
21st-century women photographers
21st-century French women artists
Alumni of Central Saint Martins
Alumni of the Royal College of Art
Artists from Paris
French photographers
French women photographers